Sugarfoot is a television Western.

Sugarfoot may also refer to:

People with the nickname
 Sugarfoot Anderson or Ezzrett Anderson, Canadian football player
 Peter "Sugarfoot" Cunningham (born March 25, 1963) is a retired Canadian 7-time World Champion Hall of Fame kickboxer, boxer, martial artist, actor and author.
 Leroy "Sugarfoot" Bonner (1943–2013), guitarist for the Ohio Players
 Jonathan Moffett, American drummer, songwriter and producer

Arts, entertainment, and media
 Sugarfoot (film), a 1951 film starring Randolph Scott